In a Box is the first official release by Australian alternative rock group, Ammonia. The five-track extended play was issued in October 1994 via the Murmur label and Sony Music Australia. It appeared on the ARIA Singles Chart top 100.

Background 

Ammonia's first release, In a Box, is a five-track extended play, which comprised the Perth-based band's early recordings paired with the newly recorded title song. They were supported by national youth radio station, Triple J playing its tracks, which expanded their fan base across Australia, and led to a national tour. Australian musicologist, Ian McFarlane, felt that the EP "outlined the band's brand of guitar-driven power pop"; while AllMusic's Kim Summers wrote that it had "received rave reviews." In a Box peaked on the ARIA Singles Chart at No. 78. The title track, "In a Box", was re-recorded and appeared on the group's debut album, Mint 400 (16 October 1995). A live version of the lead track, recorded at Triple J studios, was released on their third EP, Limited Live & Rare (1998). The United States version of their second EP, Sleepwalking (March 1996) on the Sony-associated label, Epic Records, had two tracks from In a Box: "White" and "Lucky No. 3".

Formats & track listings

AUS CD EP MATTCD002
"In a Box"
"White"
"Lucky No. 3"
"Burning Plant Smell"
"Dr. Strangeleave"
US PROMO CDS ESK 7956
"In a Box [Tom Lord-Alge Mix]"
"In a Box [Album Version]"

Charts

References 

1994 debut EPs
Ammonia (band) albums
Murmur (record label) EPs